The Most Reverend Thomas Joseph Brosnahan, Archbishop Emeritus, C.S.Sp. (30 March 1905 – 26 January 1996) was Archbishop of Freetown and Bo in Sierra Leone.

Early life 

Born in Whitegate, Ireland, on 30 March 1905. He was educated in Rockwell College, Co. Tipperary.  He played hurling for the school senior team. He entered Holy Ghost Missionary College, Kimmage Manor, Dublin to study for the Holy Ghost Fathers, and studied in Blackrock College.

Ministry 
He entered the Holy Ghost Fathers and his ordination took place on 16 June 1929. His ministry in east Nigeria began in 1933, where he remained for 20 years.

Bishop of Freetown and Bo 
He arrived in Freetown in 1953 to succeed Archbishop Ambrose Kelly, who had died the previous year. He was appointed Bishop of Freetown and Bo and began his ministry in Sierra Leone. The main focus of his work was education and he made tremendous progress in this area. He founded Christ the King College in Bo in the year of his arrival. On 9 April 1961, he performed the first ordination of a diocesan priest, Joseph Ganda, at the Immaculate Heart Church in Bo.  He was a council father in Sessions 1 to 4 of the Second Vatican Council.

First archbishop of Freetown and Bo 
Brosnahan became the first Archbishop of Freetown and Bo, in 1971. From 1971 to 1975, he was president of the Inter-territorial Catholic Bishops' Conference of The Gambia and Sierra Leone. In 1975, he erected the Archdiocesan Secretariat Santanno House on Howe Street. He retired in 1980 and was succeeded by Joseph Ganda.

Legacy 
He founded Christ the King College in 1953. Today it is a technical college that is a subsidiary of the University of Sierra Leone and has many prominent figures among its alumni, including politician Charles Margai and former vice president of Sierra Leone Solomon Berewa. A number of international students from Liberia, Gambia, Ghana and Nigeria attend the college.

References

External links 
 A Brief history of the Catholic Church in Sierra Leone
 Catholic-Hierarchy

1905 births
1996 deaths
20th-century Roman Catholic archbishops in Sierra Leone
Roman Catholic missionaries in Sierra Leone
Christ the King College
20th-century Irish Roman Catholic priests
Roman Catholic archbishops of Freetown and Bo
Irish expatriate Catholic bishops
Irish Spiritans
Holy Ghost Fathers
Burials at Dardistown Cemetery
Presidents of Inter-territorial Catholic Bishops' Conference of The Gambia and Sierra Leone
20th-century Roman Catholic bishops in Sierra Leone